Naved Ahmed (born 1 July 1986) is an Indian first-class cricketer who plays for Bengal.

References

External links
 

1986 births
Living people
Indian cricketers
Bengal cricketers
People from Fatehpur, Uttar Pradesh